This is a list of media organisations based in Belgrade, Serbia.

Radio stations

Television stations

Television production companies
 Produkcijska Grupa Mreža
 Video nedeljnik VIN
 Advance
 DТV Production
 Total Magic

Press agencies
 Таnјug
 Beta
 FoNet
 Tiker

References

Media organisations
Media, Belgrade
Belgrade
Media